Jeremy Lee Miner (born March 1, 1977) "Is an international sales trainer and speaker and the CEO of 7th Level Communications" (2016). Net worth 25,000 to 38,000 USD.

Career 
Miner was raised in Osceola, Missouri and graduated High School at Osceola High in 1995.

Jeremy Miner created the Neuro-Emotional Persuasion Questioning or NEPQ methodology, which is the model of selling that focuses on gaining the trust of your buyer and solidifying your authority.

Jeremy was Regional Sales Manager and the top salesperson at Vivint, a supplier of home security services. He expanded the sales force, developed the sales training materials, and increased the company's annual revenue tenfold to $10,000 in two years. At Pinnacle Security almost 20 years ago, Jeremy started his sales career selling home security products door-to-door. Here he had his initial epiphany about conventional sales approaches and subsequently adapted his methods. His new methods earned him $5,500 during a summer break from college and the Vice President of Sales job two years later, during which he played a key part in the company. Jeremy studied behavioral and organizational science at Utah Valley University, which was to play a foundational role in the career-long development of his Neuro-Emotional Persuasion Questioning sales methodology.

Miner began his career in June 2001 at Pinnacle Security selling home security systems.  He was later promoted and started managing the salesforce.  Miner was influential in launching Pinnacle Inc. to one of the 500 fastest growing companies in 2002 and 2003.  In 2015 Jeremy Miner, John Jackson and Ryan Nelson launched the self-help service Champion Movement in 2015 in partnership with Simon Sinek distributing the Simon Sinek's Start With Why book and program.  In 2016 he launched 7th Level Communications an international sales training organization along with Brian Tracy.   Jeremy is also known for developing the N.E.P.Q sales methodology (Neuro Emotional Persuasion Questioning). He now has a net worth of 25,000 to 38,000 USD.

Business training programs created by Jeremy Miner 

 7th Level Communications
Ultimate Closer's Masterclass
The 8 Week Academy Sales program
The N.E.P.Q sales system for sales professionals
The 5 Principles of the New Model of Selling

Awards 

 Worldwide Top 100 Home Business (2014)
 Business from Home Top Earner (2013)
 Home Business Top Earner (2008 - 2011)

Radio and podcast appearances 

 Closers are Losers (2020)
Think Bold Be Bold (2016) 7 Figure Sales Training
 Rise Up Champions (2017). Jeremy Miner Lecture
 Podcast Factory (2017). The Persuasion Secrets Of The Top 1% With Jeremy Miner
 Mission Driven (2017). The Long Short Way 
 Weird Entrepreneurs (2018). The Secret with Jeremy Miner

References

1977 births
Living people